Michele Šego (born 5 August 2000)  is a Croatian footballer who plays as a forward for Varaždin in the Croatian First Football League.

Career
Šego started playing football in the local minnows' NK Omladinac Vranjic' football school. After spending five years in the youth ranks of Adriatic Split, he was hailed as the biggest talent in the club, netting over 50 goals every season. He eventually joined the Croatian national U15 team, before moving on to the Hajduk Split academy at the age of 16.

After a quality display in the first half of the season with Hajduk's reserve team, he got called up for their senior team's League match against Cibalia that took place on 11 February 2018. He scored his first goal for Hajduk's official senior squad match against Istra 1961 on May 9, 2018, netting a volley for a 1-5 victory.

In January 2020, Šego was loaned for until the summer of 2020 to NK Slaven Belupo. Returning at the end of the season, he was loaned out again in August 2020, this time to NK Bravo in the Slovenian PrvaLiga for the 2020-21 season.

References

External links
 

2000 births
Living people
Footballers from Split, Croatia
Association football forwards
Croatian footballers
Croatia youth international footballers
HNK Hajduk Split II players
HNK Hajduk Split players
NK Slaven Belupo players
NK Bravo players
NK Dugopolje players
NK Varaždin (2012) players
Croatian Football League players
First Football League (Croatia) players
Slovenian PrvaLiga players
Croatian expatriate footballers
Expatriate footballers in Slovenia
Croatian expatriate sportspeople in Slovenia